The Ba Ba - Central Park is a residential skyscraper located in Qianjin District, Kaohsiung, Taiwan. As of December 2020, it is the 15th tallest building in Kaohsiung. The building was completed in 2015.

See also 
 List of tallest buildings in Taiwan
 List of tallest buildings in Kaohsiung
 Guo-Yan Building BC
 Kingtown King Park
 Xin-Fu-Hwa

References

2015 establishments in Taiwan
Apartment buildings in Taiwan
Residential skyscrapers in Taiwan
Skyscrapers in Kaohsiung